Karl Weinbacher (23 June 1898 – 16 May 1946) was a German manager and war criminal who was executed after conviction by a British war tribunal. He and his boss, Bruno Tesch, hold the dubious distinction of becoming the only businessmen to be executed for their role in Nazi atrocities in Western Europe.

Life

Weinbacher worked at Degesch (Deutsche Gesellschaft für Schädlingsbekämpfung, which translates as German Corporation for Pest Control) until 1924, and then at Tesch & Stabenow (Testa, for short), where he received the position of manager in 1927, and by 1943 was director and deputy executive under owner and chief executive officer Bruno Tesch. Testa manufactured and sold Zyklon B, which was used not only for pest control and disinfestation, but also in the Holocaust in the gas chambers of Auschwitz to murder people. Weinbacher received a commission on all of the company's profits, including the Zyklon B sales.

After the end of World War II, Weinbacher, Tesch and Joachim Drosihn, the firm's first gassing technician, were arrested on 3 September 1945. They were tried by a British military tribunal at the Curiohaus trials in Hamburg from 1–8 March 1946, also called the Testa trial or the Zyklon B trial. In the cases of Weinbacher and Tesch, the court ruled that the prosecution had proven that both of them knew how the SS would use Zyklon B. Tesch and Weinbacher were convicted and sentenced to death on 8 March 1946, while Drosihn was acquitted. Tesch and Weinbacher were hanged in the prison for war criminals in Hamelin on 16 May 1946.

Bibliography
Angelika Ebbinghaus: Der Prozeß gegen Weinbacher und Stabenow - Von der Schädlingsbekämpfung zum Holocaust. In: 1999 - Zeitschrift für Sozialgeschichte des 19. und 20. Jahrhunderts 13 (1998), H. 2, p. 16–71 (pdf)
Jürgen Kalthoff / Martin Werner: Die Händler des Zyklon B. - Weinbacher & Stabenow. Eine Firmengeschichte zwischen Hamburg und Auschwitz. Hamburg 1998, .

References

External links
Biography (in German)

1898 births
1946 deaths
Holocaust perpetrators
Businesspeople from Szczecin
Curiohaus trials executions by hanging
Executed mass murderers